John McCarthy (born August 9, 1986) is an American ice hockey coach and former left winger who currently is the head coach for the San Jose Barracuda in the American Hockey League (AHL). He formerly played with the San Jose Sharks of the National Hockey League (NHL).

Playing career
McCarthy played the 2004–05 season with the Des Moines Buccaneers of the United States Hockey League. He then played collegiate hockey with Boston University in the Hockey East before he was drafted by the San Jose Sharks, 202nd overall in the 2006 NHL Entry Draft.

McCarthy made his NHL debut on January 9, 2010, and earned his first NHL point on October 21, 2010 against the Colorado Avalanche, by assisting Scott Nichol to score a game-tying goal at the end of the first period. His first NHL goal was scored the next game, on October 23, against Nikolai Khabibulin of the Edmonton Oilers.

In the 2013–14 season, his fifth within the Sharks organization, McCarthy split the season between Worcester and San Jose, scoring 1 goal and assist in 36 games.

On July 4, 2014, McCarthy signed as a free agent to a one-year, two-way contract with the St. Louis Blues. On January 14, 2015, the St. Louis Blues loaned McCarthy back to the Worcester Sharks in exchange for Adam Burish to play for the Blues' AHL affiliate the Chicago Wolves.

On July 1, 2015, McCarthy returned to the San Jose Sharks in full, signing a one-year, two-way contract as a free agent. On July 11, 2016, McCarthy opted to return for a second season with the Barracuda, signing a one-year AHL contract as a free agent on July 11, 2016. He re-signed with the Barracuda on April 19, 2018.

On December 27, 2019, McCarthy announced his retirement for health reasons; he had suffered an Ischemic stroke on December 10 due to an undetected hole in his heart. Later in the day, he joined the Barracuda's coaching staff. He was named the Barracuda's head coach on May 18, 2022.

Career statistics

Regular season and playoffs

International

Awards and honors

References

External links

1986 births
American men's ice hockey left wingers
Boston University Terriers men's ice hockey players
Chicago Wolves players
Des Moines Buccaneers players
Ice hockey coaches from Massachusetts
Ice hockey players at the 2018 Winter Olympics
Living people
Olympic ice hockey players of the United States
Sportspeople from Boston
San Jose Barracuda players
San Jose Sharks draft picks
San Jose Sharks players
Worcester Sharks players
Ice hockey people from Boston